Sean George (born November 9, 1978), known under the stage name Diabolic, is an American rapper. He started receiving fame after his verse on Immortal Technique's song "Dance with the Devil". He is also a well-known battle rapper who has battled with rappers such as Immortal Technique, MC Jin, Mecca, Iron Solomon and Rhymefest, among others. He released The Foul Play Mixtape in October 2006.

In 2010, Diabolic released Liar & A Thief, which was produced by Engineer with the exception of the song "Riot" featuring Deadly Hunta, which was produced by John Otto of Limp Bizkit on live drums. The album featured guest appearances from Immortal Technique, Canibus, Vinnie Paz, and Ill Bill, and won the 2010 HHUG Album of the Year award. His debut album was also listed on Billboards R&B/Hip-Hop Albums chart at #76 in April 2010. He released his most recent album, The Disconnect, in 2019.

Biography
Sean was born and raised in Huntington Station on Long Island, New York In 1978. He grew up in a lower-middle-class family in a suburban neighborhood. His interest in hip-hop started when he listened to his older brother's hip-hop tapes, featuring artists such as EPMD, N.W.A. and Black Sheep when he was a child. When Sean was in his early teens, he became interested in graffiti and writing his own lyrics.

Diabolic was a street battle legend on Long Island. He sharply developed and fine tuned his verbal wit, and battling skills over the years by battling anyone willing to step to him at record stores, hip-hop events, parties, street corners, and clubs, all throughout Nassau and Suffolk Counties.  In late 1999, he took his talent to the New York City underground and made a name for himself in a number of high-profile battles in the legendary New York City venue known as the Wetlands.
      
In 2003, Immortal Technique was touring nationally and supported him. Sean was working on his debut album entitled Liar & a Thief and found a producer in Vancouver named Engineer. They worked heavily together and released Liar & a Thief. He was featured on a King Syze album Collective Bargaining, the song was titled The Strike Line and featured Army of the Pharaohs.

On January 28, 2012, Diabolic confirmed the launch of his own record label, "WarHorse Records".

On February 10, 2012, Diabolic released a diss track to Tyler, the Creator over the instrumental of Tyler's own "Yonkers". The track was a response to the title track of Goblin, where Tyler mentions Immortal Technique.

In 2016, a feud was ignited between Diabolic and a fellow New York rapper from Brooklyn known as Talib Kweli (Reflection Eternal, Blackstar). After a back-and-forth on Twitter in April in which Diabolic accused Kweli of making generalizations about "White Rappers", Kweli penned an article in May titled When ‘White Fragility’ Affects Rappers, in which he discussed his views on white rappers and referenced Diabolic.

Discography

Albums
Liar & a Thief (2010)
Fightin' Words (2014)
Collusion (with Vanderslice) (2019)
The Disconnect (2019)

Mixtapes
The Foul Play Mixtape (2006)

EPs
Triple Optix EP (2000)

References

External links

Diabolic on Reddit
Diabolic on Bandcamp
Diabolic on Discogs

American male rappers
East Coast hip hop musicians
Living people
People from Huntington Station, New York
Rappers from New York (state)
Underground rappers
21st-century American rappers
21st-century American male musicians
1978 births